Stina Åsa Maria Ekblad (born 26 February 1954 in Solf, Ostrobothnia, Finland) is a Swedish-speaking Finnish actress. Living in Stockholm, she has appeared mostly in Swedish productions. She received a Guldbagge Award for Best Actress in 1987 for her performances in Amorosa and Ormens väg på hälleberget (The Serpent's Way) and was nominated again in 1996 for her performance in Pensionat Oskar.

Ekblad was born in the Ostrobothnian village of Solf in 1954. The village is nowadays part of the municipality of Korsholm.

Selected filmography
Fanny and Alexander (1982)
The Serpent's Way (1986)
Amorosa (1986)
Lethal Film (1988)
Friends, Comrades (1990)
Agnes Cecilia – en sällsam historia (1991)
Carl, My Childhood Symphony (1993)
Pensionat Oskar (1995)
Faithless (2000)
As White as in Snow (2001)
At Point Blank (2003)
Krøniken (2004–2006) – TV series
Wallander (2005–2013) – TV series
Crimes of Passion (2013)

References

External links

1954 births
Living people
People from Korsholm
Swedish-speaking Finns
Finnish actresses
Swedish actresses
Eugene O'Neill Award winners
Litteris et Artibus recipients
Best Actress Guldbagge Award winners
Finnish expatriates in Sweden